The 2013 FIVB Women's World Grand Champions Cup was held in Nagoya and Tokyo, Japan from November 12 to 17, 2013. Brazil won their second title and Brazilian Fabiana Claudino was selected the Most Valuable Player.

Teams

Competition formula
The competition formula of the 2013 Women's World Grand Champions Cup was a single Round-Robin system. Each team played once against each of the five remaining teams. Points were accumulated during the whole tournament, and the final standing was determined by the total points gained.

Venues

Results

|}

Nagoya round
Venue: Nippon Gaishi Hall, Nagoya, Japan

|}

Tokyo round
Venue: Tokyo Metropolitan Gymnasium, Tokyo, Japan

|}

Final standing

Awards

Most Valuable Player
  Fabiana Claudino
Best Setter
  Hitomi Nakamichi
Best Outside Spikers
  Saori Sakoda
  Onuma Sittirak

Best Middle Blockers
  Iuliia Morozova
  Pleumjit Thinkaow
Best Opposite Spiker
  Gina Mambrú
Best Libero
  Arisa Sato

References

External links
Official website
Organizer website (in Japanese)

2013 Women
FIVB Women's World Grand Champions Cup
FIVB Women's World Grand Champions Cup
2013 FIVB Women's World Grand Champions Cup